Ash sharaf may refer to:

Ash sharaf, San‘a’, Yemen
Ash sharaf, Abyan, Yemen